AEK Larnaca FC ("Athletic Union Kition of Larnaca") is a Cypriot professional football club based in Larnaca. The club was formed in 1994 after a merger of two historical Larnaca clubs, EPA Larnaca and Pezoporikos. The club also has a men's basketball team, a women's volleyball team and a men's futsal team. 

The club's name comes from the ancient Greek city of Cyprus, Kition, which was located on the site of today's Larnaca. The colours of the club are yellow and green, and their emblem is admiral Kimon, who died at the seafront while defending the city of Kition circa 450 BC, in a fight against the Persians. He had told his officers to keep the news of his possible death secret. The quote "Και Νεκρος Ενικα" ("Even in death he was victorious") refers to Kimon.

The club's key milestones - beside being runner-up for the league 5 times - , are qualifying to the 2011–12 and 2022–23 UEFA Europa League group stages, winning the Cypriot Cup in two instances in 2004 and 2018, its Champions League debut in 2022, and becoming the second Cypriot club to make the Round of 16 of a European competition, and the first to do so in the Europa Conference League.

History

Foundation
AEK was founded on 18 July 1994. It came from the merger of two historic Larnaca clubs, EPA Larnaca and Pezoporikos.

EPA and Pezoporikos 
Pezoporikos had been established in 1924. In 1926, serving retired members of Pezoporikos founded AMOL (stands for "Athletic Educational Union of Larnaca" in Greek). In 1932, the two clubs were merged, creating EPA Larnaca (EPA stands for "Union of Pezoporikos-AMOL" in Greek). However, in 1937 a group of members and players of EPA left and refounded Pezoporikos. After several decades, in 1994, the two clubs were merged and created AEK Larnaca.

EPA had 50 participations in the first division, won the championship three times (1945, 1946, 1970), the Cypriot Cup on five occasions (1945, 1946, 1950, 1953, 1955), and in one instance won the Super Cup (1955). In addition, during the season 1970–71, EPA participated in the Alpha Ethniki of Greece. They also had three appearances in European competitions.

Pezoporikos had 49 participations in the first division, won two championships (1954, 1988) and one Cypriot Cup (1970). They also had three appearances in European competitions.

Apart from football, the two clubs had other athletic departments. The decision to merge was made, in order to create a sports club in Larnaca which could star in all competitions (football, basketball, volleyball, etc.) without financial problems.

1994–1999: The early years
After the merger of Pezoporikos and EPA, AEK replaced Pezoporikos in the first division (EPA had been relegated in the last season of its existence). In its first participation in the championship, in the 1994–95 season, AEK finished in 9th place. In the 1995–96 season, they finished 4th. AEK and APOEL were tied for the best defense in the league with 21 conceded goals. In the 1995–96 Cypriot Cup, the club reached the final, where they lost to APOEL.

However, because APOEL had won the championship and participated in the 1996–97 UEFA Cup, the finalists of the Cypriot Cup, AEK represented Cyprus in the 1996–97 UEFA Cup Winners' Cup. In the preliminary round, AEK faced the Armenian club Kotayk Abovyan. The first match took place in Armenia (8 August 1996), where AEK lost 1–0. The second leg was held at the New GSZ Stadium on 22 August 1996 with AEK winning 5–0 and progressing to the first round of the tournament. In this round, AEK were drawn to face Barcelona. The first leg (12 September 1996) was held at the Barcelona Olympic Stadium, where the Spanish team won 2–0. The second leg took place at the GSZ Stadium (26 September 1996) and ended in a 0–0 draw, meaning Barcelona had qualified. They would go on to reach the final and win the competition.

Before the beginning of the 1996–97 season, AEK, as runners-up of the Cypriot Cup, played against the league winners for the Super Cup, losing 1–0. In the 1996–97 season, AEK finished in 4th place and reached the semi-finals of the domestic cup. This was followed by 5th place in 1997–98, before returning to 4th place in the 1998–99 season.

2000s
For three seasons in a row, 1999–00, 2000–01 and 2001–02, AEK finished in 7th place. In the 1999–00 season they reached the Cypriot Cup semi-finals, and in the 2002–03 season they finished in 8th place.

The 2003–04 season was very important for the history of the team, as they managed to win their first trophy. Although they finished 9th in the league, they reached the final of the Cup, where they beat AEL Limassol at the GSP stadium with a score of 2–1. Winning the cup gave AEK the opportunity to participate European football for the second time, in the 2004–05 UEFA Cup, where they faced faced Maccabi Petah Tikva in the second qualifying round of the competition. The first match took place on 12 August 2004 at the GSP stadium where AEK won 3–0. However, in the rematch in Israel, AEK lost 4–0 and was eliminated from the tournament.

In 2004, as cup winners, AEK faced league champions APOEL for the Cypriot Super Cup.  AEK lost 5–4 after extra time. In the 2004–05 season AEK finished in 9th place, just three points clear of relegation. The following season they finished 8th. In the 2005–06 Cypriot Cup, AEK reached the final against APOEL. The final took place at AEK's home ground, the GSZ Stadium, however, they failed to win the trophy, being defeated 3–2 after extra time.

In the 2006–07 season, AEK finished in 7th place and reached the semi-finals of the 2006–07 Cypriot Cup. In the 2007–08 season, AEK finished 4th in the league. AEK's worst league finish came in the 2008–09 season where they placed 13th and were relegated to the Second Division, for the first time in the club's history.

2010s
In the 2009–10 season, AEK finished 2nd in the Second Division, and were promoted back to the First Division. The following season, AEK finished in 4th place, allowing them to participate in the 2011–12 UEFA Europa League.

In the 2011–12 season, the club finished 5th and reached the semi-finals of the Cypriot Cup. In the 2012–13 season, AEK finished 4th in the league and made it to the semi-finals of the cup once more. In the 2013–14 season, the team placed 8th after a mediocre campaign.

UEFA Europa League 2011–2012 Group Stages
The participation of the team in the 2011–12 Europa League was historic for both the club and for Cypriot football. AEK Larnaca became the first Cypriot team to qualify to the group stage of the Europa League (Anorthosis and APOEL had previously qualified to the Champions League groups stage). In the second qualifying round, AEK faced Maltese Floriana who they beat 8–0 away and 1–0 at home. Their away win is the largest winning range of a Cypriot team in any European competition. In the third qualifying round, AEK faced the Czech Mladá Boleslav. In the first match, AEK won 3–0 at home, while in the second leg the teams were drawn by 2–2 with AEK qualifying to the play-offs of the Europa League. Their next opponent was the Norwegian Rosenborg. A goalless draw was the result of the first leg between the two teams. In the second leg (which was held at the Antonis Papadopoulos Stadium due to the fact that UEFA deemed the GSZ Stadium inappropriate for that phase of the tournament), AEK won 2–1 and qualified through to the group stages of the tournament.

In the group stage, the team faced Schalke 04, Maccabi Haifa and Steaua Bucharest. The only stadium in Cyprus which could host matches of group stages of European competitions was the GSP Stadium, where AEK played its home matches in the group stage. AEK finished at the bottom of Group J and was eliminated. AEK finished the group with one win (2–1 at home against Maccabi Haifa) and two draws (0–0 away against Schalke 04 and 1–1 home against Steaua), gathering five points. During that season, AEK set a new unbeaten record for Cypriot clubs in Europe, at six matches (four wins and two draws during the qualifying phase of the tournament). The same record is also hold by APOEL in the same season, but with three wins and three draws.

Spanish Larnaca
In 2014, the arrival of sporting director Xavi Roca marked the beginning of a Spanish era at AEK Larnaca. Under the coach Thomas Christiansen, there were six regular starters from Spain in the lineup during the 2014–15 season. That season, the team challenged for the championship trophy until the last matchday. In the penultimate matchday, the team faced APOEL with whom they drew 1–1. If AEK had won, they would go to the top of the table. In the last matchday, AEK beat Anorthosis and finished 2nd for first time in its history.

As in 2014–15, Larnaca finished in 2nd place in the League for the 2015–16 season. As it was the case in the previous season, there were six Spaniards in the starting eleven, but this time just one player from Cyprus.

Christiansen then left to League rivals APOEL Nicosia. He was replaced by a Spaniard, Imanol Idiakez. Under Idiakez, Larnaca finished second once again in the 2016–17 season. The team's highest scorers in the league were Ivan Trickovski with 14 goals, followed by the Spaniard Acorán Barrera who netted 9 goals. Idiakez nominated seven Spaniards as regular starters, but not a single player from Cyprus. The 2017–18 season saw AEK Larnaca finishing in 4th place but winning the Cyprus Cup for the second time. The French striker Florian Taulemesse scored a staggering 22 goals in the championship and was nominated player of the year and player of the Cyprus Cup Final for the season. Imanol Idiakez completed 100 games as AEK Larnaca coach, and in his final game he won the Cypriot Cup.

2020s 
Led by David Catala, and interim coach David Badia towards the end of the season, AEK Larnaca finished 2nd in the 2021–22 campaign. Cyprus' ranking in the UEFA coefficients at the time, meant that AEK had qualified for Champions League football, for the first time in the club's history. Spaniard José Luis Oltra was brought in as the new coach for the 2022–23 season. 

AEK made its Champions League debut in a qualifying round against Midtjylland on 19 July 2022. They were eliminated on penalties following two consecutive draws, and dropped into the qualifying rounds of the Europa League where they knocked-out FK Partizan and SC Dnipro-1, entering the Europa League group stage for the second time in the club's history.

AEK finished third in Group B of the 2022–23 Europa League, and secured its place in the preliminary knockout round of the Europa Conference League, where they would go on to eliminate SC Dnipro-1 to enter the Round of 16. This made AEK the second Cypriot club to "survive" a European group stage, and make it to the round of 16 of any European Competition, and the first and only Cypriot club to make the preliminary knockout, and the round of 16 of the Europa Conference League.

Stadium

Since October 2016, AEK Larnaca's home ground is the AEK Arena which opened its doors hosting the very first match of AEK Larnaka against Aris Limassol.

The previous home stadium of the football team was the Neo GSZ Stadium, which was common used by EPA and Pezoporikos. Before the construction of the stadium, the two teams used old GSZ stadium.

Honours

Domestic
Cypriot Championship

Runner-up (5): 2014–15, 2015–16, 2016–17, 2018–19, 2021–22
Cypriot Cup:
Winners (2): 2003–04, 2017–18
Runner-up (2): 1995–96, 2005–06
Cypriot Super Cup:
Winners (1): 2018
Runner-up (2): 1996, 2004

European competitions record

Last update: 5 November 2022

Matches

Players

Current squad

Other players under contract

Academy players with professional contracts

Out on loan

Active International players

Foreign players

Club officials

Board of directors

Source: ΔΙΟΙΚΗΤΙΚΟ ΣΥΜΒΟΥΛΙΟ

Technical and medical staff

Source: ΤΕΧΝΙΚΗ ΗΓΕΣΙΑ

Other staff

Academy organisation

Source: ΟΡΓΑΝΟΓΡΑΜΜΑ

Sponsorship
 Major Sponsor – Meridian Bet
 TV Sponsor – PrimeTel PLC
 Clothing Sponsor – Puma
 Website Sponsor – Ideaseven Creative Solutions
 Official Sponsors:
 AJK Wealth Management Limited
 Petrolina
 K. Treppides & CO Certified Public Accountants
 C & C Londou Bros
 SunnySeeker Hotels
 ZEMCO Group
 McDonald's
 UCLan Cyprus
 METRO Supermarkets
 Kapnos Airport Shuttle
 Top Kinisis Travel

Supporters

 KPMG
 Tofalli Construction & Development
 Marselli Aluminium Cyprus
 Pissis Signs
 YDROGIOS INSURANCE COMPANY LTD
 Theasis Online Ticketing

 Lefteris Livadhiotis & Sons
 Nicolaides Group
 DioCare Natural Products
 Zenon Tavern
 Mazzo Food & Bar
 Titan Office

Source: aek.com.cy

Former players

Managerial history

UEFA and IFFHS rankings

UEFA Club ranking

Last update: 27 August 2020

IFFHS Club World ranking

Last update: 16 January 2018

References

External links
 Official website
 AEK Unofficial blog
 AEK Fans site
 
 

 
Football clubs in Cyprus
Association football clubs established in 1994
1994 establishments in Cyprus
Football clubs in Larnaca